The 2016 Atlantic Coast Conference baseball tournament was held from May 24 through 29 at Durham Bulls Athletic Park in Durham, North Carolina.  The annual tournament determined the conference champion of the Division I Atlantic Coast Conference for college baseball.  The tournament champion will receive the league's automatic bid to the 2016 NCAA Division I baseball tournament.  This is the last of 19 athletic championship events held by the conference in the 2015–16 academic year.

Clemson, under first year head coach Monte Lee, defeated defending champion Florida State in the championship game to win its 10th ACC Tournament championship, breaking a tie with Georgia Tech for most tournament titles.  The title was Clemson's 15th overall ACC championship in baseball (also most all-time in the conference), its first ACC championship since 2006, and first tournament championship under the pool play format that began in 2007. The championship game, hampered by weather delays, took 9 hours and 20 minutes to complete, with first pitch being thrown at 11:02 A.M. and the final out recorded at 7:22 P.M.

Format and seeding
The winner of each seven team division and the top eight other teams based on conference winning percentage, regardless of division, from the conference's regular season will be seeded one through ten.  Seeds one and two are awarded to the two division winners.  The bottom four seeds play an opening round, with the winners advancing to pool play.  The winner of each pool plays a single championship.

Schedule and results

Play-in round

Pool play

Championship

Schedule

All-Tournament Team

‡ - Tournament MVP

References

Tournament
Atlantic Coast Conference baseball tournament
Atlantic Coast Conference baseball tournament
Atlantic Coast Conference baseball tournament
Baseball competitions in Durham, North Carolina
College baseball tournaments in North Carolina